The bombing of Peenemünde in World War II was carried out on several occasions as part of the overall Operation Crossbow to disrupt German secret weapon development. The first raid on Peenemünde, on the Baltic coast of Germany, was Operation Hydra of the night of 17/18 August 1943, involving 596 heavy bombers of the Royal Air Force. Intelligence about the existence and location of the programme was said by some to have been obtained from the secretly recorded conversations of a German officer, Wilhelm Ritter von Thoma, who was a prisoner of war of the British. However, von Thoma is not mentioned in declassified files and the story may have fabricated in order to protect members of the Belgian and Luxemburg resistance. The official history of MI6 by Prof Keith Jeffery cites several sources including a tip-off from forced labourers drafted in to work at Peenemünde.  Subsequent attacks were carried out in daylight raids by the US Army Air Force's Eighth Air Force.
Among those on the ground at Peenemünde were Walter Dornberger, noted rocket expert Wernher von Braun, and Nazi female test pilot Hanna Reitsch, who later claimed to have slept through the raid. 
Some markers were dropped too far south, and ultimately a number of buildings remained undamaged, while many bombs hit the forced labour camps, killing between 500 and 600 prisoners. However, sufficient damage was caused to delay the V-weapons programme for some months, and the senior engineer Dr Walter Thiel was among the dead.

Operations

References and notes
Notes

Bibliography
 Clare Mulley, The Women Who Flew for Hitler (Macmillan, 2017)

External links
 National Collection of Aerial Photography

Bombing of Peenemünde
World War II strategic bombing of Germany
World War II strategic bombing conducted by the United Kingdom
Aerial operations and battles of World War II involving the United States
Bombing of Peenemünde
Bombing of Peenemünde
Bombing of Peenemünde